Hanušovice Highlands are highlands within the Eastern Sudetes mountain range that runs between Poland and the Czech Republic. It is named after Hanušovice town.

The area is 793 km² and its average elevation is 527.2 meters. The highlands mostly consists of crystallized slate and Paleozoic folded sediments with Neogene and Quaternary sediments in lower parts. Isolated rocks often occur on highland peaks.

Mountain ranges of the Czech Republic
Sudetes
Geography of the Moravian-Silesian Region
Highlands